Qarachaqay Khan (died 1625) was a military commander in Safavid Iran of Armenian origin. He was known for his great collection of porcelain items and loyal service to Shah Abbas I. Qarachaqay Khan was killed while commanding an expedition against the Georgian rebels.

Career 
Born as a Christian Armenian in Erivan, Qarachaqay was enslaved in childhood and brought to the Safavid court to be raised as a gholam. He began his career in a royal tailoring workshop and was soon distinguished in the Safavid army as an artillery officer. In 1605, Qarachaqay Beg, being in charge of a musketeer regiment, under the command of Allahverdi Khan—also originally a gholam of Georgian origin—contributed to Abbas I's victory over the Ottoman forces at Sufiyan near Tabriz.

During his career in the Safavid army and administration, Qarachaqay amassed a valuable collection of Chinese porcelain which he presented to Shah Abbas around 1610. Shortly afterwards, Qarachaqay was bestowed with the title of muqarab al-hazrat ("intimate of the illustrious"), reserved for the Shah's close companions. In 1616, he received the title of khan and was appointed commander-in-chief (sepahsalar-e Iran) of the Safavid army. A year after the defeat of the Ottoman troops led by Khalil Pasha, he became governor of Tabriz and all of Azerbaijan, but was soon recalled by the shah to continue his service as governor of Mashhad in northeastern Khorasan in 1618. When Abbas I decided to marry his granddaughter to Semayun Khan of Kartli (Simon II) in 1624, Qarachaqay Khan ordered Yusuf Khan, likewise of Christian Armenian origin and a childhood friend, to host the banquet in the first term of the wedding party. In the same year, Qarachaqay Khan, accompanied by the Safavid Georgian officer Murav-Beg (Giorgi Saakadze), captained a punitive expedition against the rebels in Georgia. Murav-Beg conspired with the insurgents, who unexpectedly attacked and destroyed the Iranian camp at Martqopi, killing Qarachaqay Khan and one of his sons, Imam Verdi Khan. Both were buried within a family shrine complex in Mashhad.

Of Qarachaqay Khan's other sons, Abu al-Fath Manuchihr Khan (died 1636) rose to the governorship of Mashhad and Ali Quli Khan became prefect of Qom and head of the shah's library. Manuchihr Khan's son, Qarachaqay Khan (died c. 1668), was also governor of Mashhad. All of them were known as sponsors of learning and culture.

See also 
 Shahnameh of Qarachaqay Khan

Notes

References 
 
 
  
 
 
 

1625 deaths
Converts to Shia Islam from Christianity
Ethnic Armenian Shia Muslims
Persian Armenians
Military personnel from Yerevan
Armenian former Christians
Safavid governors of Mashhad
Safavid governors of Azerbaijan
Qollar-aghasi
Commanders-in-chief of Safavid Iran
17th-century people of Safavid Iran
Safavid ghilman
Patrons of the arts